Vincentia is a town in New South Wales, Australia in the City of Shoalhaven, on the shores of Jervis Bay. It is also a tourist spot with a beach area featuring white sand and a number of motels.

History
The traditional owners of the area around Vincentia were a group of the Yuin, members of what early settlers called 'the Jervis Bay tribe'. The 'Jervis Bay tribe' are also known as the Wandandian people and spoke Dharamba, which was probably the northernmost dialect of the Dhurga language.  

Vincentia was originally known as 'South Huskisson' and later as 'The Old Township'. It was founded in 1841 as a seaport and terminus of The Wool Road from Nerriga. South Huskisson lay on land originally owned by Edward Deas Thompson and was a 'private town'. In 1842, a wharf was built near the current location of the Holden Street boat ramp.

The road and port were not successes. By 1867, the town of South Huskisson was deserted—any buildings were just ruins by 1885—and there was virtually nothing remaining of the old town by the 1930s. Many street names from 'The Old Township' are still in use today and much of the original street plan remains.

In 1952 it was renamed Vincentia (after St Vincent County, which was named after John Jervis, 1st Earl of St Vincent) by developer Henry Halloran. John Jervis was created Earl of St Vincent as a result of his victory at the battle of Cape St Vincent. Jervis Bay was also named after him. The town was reborn as a holiday destination, following land sales for holiday homes (also known as 'weekenders'), which occurred in the 1950s and 1960s.

References

External links

Shoalhaven region general information
Vincentia Community Portal
VISITNSW.com - Vincentia

Towns in the South Coast (New South Wales)
City of Shoalhaven
Coastal towns in New South Wales